Toro Point is a point which forms the south extremity of Schmidt Peninsula and the north side of the entrance to Unwin Cove, Trinity Peninsula. Named by the fifth Chilean Antarctic Expedition (1950–51) after Carlos Toro Mazote G. who, as an aviation lieutenant in 1947, was one of the men chosen to occupy the General Bernardo O'Higgins station nearby. He was also a member of the fifth Chilean expedition aboard the ship Lientur.

See also
Estay Rock

References

Headlands of Trinity Peninsula